The 2010–11 ISU Speed Skating World Cup, officially the Essent ISU World Cup Speed Skating 2010–2011, was a series of  international speed skating competitions which ran the entire season. The season started on 12 November 2010 in Heerenveen, Netherlands, and ended on 6 March 2011, also in Heerenveen. In total, eight competition weekends were held at seven different locations, ten cups were contested (five for men, and five for women), and 70 races took place.

The World Cup is organized by the International Skating Union (ISU).

Calendar 

Note: the men's 5000 and 10000 metres were contested as one cup, and the women's 3000 and 5000 metres were contested as one cup, as indicated by the color coding.

World records

World records going into the 2010–11 season.

Men

Women

At the World Cup stop in Salt Lake City on 18 February 2011, Martina Sáblíková of the Czech Republic set a new world record on the women's 5000 metres with a time of 6:42.66.

Men's standings

500 m

1000 m

1500 m

5000 and 10000 m

Team pursuit

Women's standings

500 m

1000 m

1500 m

3000 and 5000 m

Team pursuit

References

External links 
International Skating Union
2010–11 ISU Speed Skating World Cup

 
10-11
Isu Speed Skating World Cup, 2010-11
Isu Speed Skating World Cup, 2010-11